Bernard Joseph Leger "Ben" Boutin (March 29, 1953 – 1986) was a farmer and political figure in Saskatchewan. He represented Kinistino from 1982 to 1986 in the Legislative Assembly of Saskatchewan as a Progressive Conservative.

He was born in Cudworth, Saskatchewan, the son of Jean-Marie Boutin. He lived in Domremy.

Electoral history

|-
 
|style="width: 130px"|Progressive Conservative
|Bernard Boutin
|align="right"|4,266
|align="right"|51.57%
|align="right"|+15.65
 
|NDP
|Donald Cody
|align="right"|3,759
|align="right"|45.44%
|align="right"|-9.11

|- bgcolor="white"
!align="left" colspan=3|Total
!align="right"|8,272
!align="right"|100.00%
!align="right"|

References 

1953 births
1986 deaths
Progressive Conservative Party of Saskatchewan MLAs
Fransaskois people